Bayerotrochus is a genus of sea snails, marine gastropod mollusks in the family Pleurotomariidae.

The generic name Bayerotrochus is in honor of marine biologist Frederick Bayer.

The shells of the snails in this genus show a selenizone.

Species
Species within the genus Bayerotrochus include:
Bayerotrochus africanus (Tomlin, 1948)
Bayerotrochus boucheti (Anseeuw & Poppe, 2001)
Bayerotrochus charlestonensis (Askew, 1988)
Bayerotrochus diluculum (Okutani, 1979)
Bayerotrochus indicus (Anseeuw, 1999)
Bayerotrochus midas (Bayer, 1966)
Bayerotrochus philpoppei Anseeuw, Poppe & Goto, 2006
Bayerotrochus poppei Anseeuw, 2003
Bayerotrochus pyramus (Bayer, 1967)
Bayerotrochus quiquandoni Cossignani, 2018
Bayerotrochus tangaroanus (Bouchet & Métivier, 1982)
Bayerotrochus teramachii (Kuroda, 1955)
Bayerotrochus westralis (Whitehead, 1987)

References

 Anseeuw P. (2010) Checklist of the family Pleurotomariidae

External links

Pleurotomariidae